The Fifth Chamber of Deputies of the Ottoman Empire was elected in the 1914 Ottoman general election, and served from 1914 to 1919.

Members

Notes

References

Sources 
 
 
 
 

Politics of the Ottoman Empire
1914 elections in Asia
Ottoman Empire-related lists
1914 establishments in the Ottoman Empire